Kodinsk is a town and the administrative center of Kezhemsky District of Krasnoyarsk Krai, Russia, located on the Angara River,  north of Krasnoyarsk. Population:

History
It was founded in 1977 as the settlement of Kodinskoye servicing the construction of the Boguchanskaya hydroelectric power station; the name is after the Koda River, a tributary of the Angara that ends about 12 km northeast of the town. The name Koda in turn is derived from Evenki word kada, meaning "cliff". It was granted urban-type settlement status in 1978 and town status in 1989.

Administrative and municipal status
Within the framework of administrative divisions, Kodinsk serves as the administrative center of Kezhemsky District. As an administrative division, it is, together with the village of Syromolotovo, incorporated within Kezhemsky District as the district town of Kodinsk. As a municipal division, the district town of Kodinsk is incorporated within Kezhemsky Municipal District as Kodinsk Urban Settlement.

References

Notes

Sources

Cities and towns in Krasnoyarsk Krai
Cities and towns built in the Soviet Union
Populated places established in 1977